John IV of Alexandria may refer to:

 Patriarch John IV of Alexandria, Greek Patriarch of Alexandria in 569–579
 Pope John IV of Alexandria, ruled in 777–799